Paramphilius baudoni is a species of loach catfish found in Cameroon, the Republic of Congo and Gabon.  It reaches a length of 7.5 cm.

References 
 

Amphiliidae
Freshwater fish of Central Africa
Fish described in 1928